Violette Impellizzeri  (born 1977 in Palermo), is an Italian astronomer, astrophysicist, and professor.

Biography 
Violette Impellizzeri was born in Saronno, in the Province of Varese.  Her family moved to Alcamo, Sicily where she attended primary and secondary school. They then moved to Karlsruhe, Germany where her father worked as a teacher. 

She completed her studies at the European School of Karlsruhe, where she earned her European baccalaureate. In 1995, she entered the University of Bristol. She obtained a master's degree in Physics and later attained a doctorate in astrophysics at the Max Planck Institute für Radioastronomie in Bonn. Impellizzeri moved to the United States as a postdoctoral researcher in Charlottesville, Virginia. She worked for three years at the NRAO (National Radio Astronomy Observatory) researching physical cosmology and the megamaser (MCP). 

In 2011, she started working with ALMA (Atacama Large Millimeter Array) in Chile. She began working there as an astronomer and gained experience with the operation of ALMA. In October 2020, she moved back to Europe, and worked as a program manager with Allegro (ALMA Local Expertise Group) and the European ALMA Regional Center (ARC) node in the Netherlands, hosted by Leiden Observatory. She teaches at Leiden University.

Activity
During Impellizzeri's work on Active Galactic Nuclei, as a part of her doctorate at Bonn University, she projected a series of observations with the scope of detecting water masers (Microwave Amplification by Stimulated Emission of Radiation) in distant galaxies.
The project was carried on by using the Effelsberg 100-m Radio Telescope, a very large moving steel structure that orientates with extraordinary submillimetre precision.

The research was successful because the water maser was detected with the first attempt and the discovery has been confirmed by the Very Large Array Radio Telescope of the New Mexico (NRAO). Additionally, the Electromagnetic wave of maser found a random and fortuitous alignment with a body of large mass (a massive galaxy) which behaved like a gravitational lens, enabling the focalization and magnification of the signal (and then making it visible).
By considering the speed of light, she discovered that these water molecules had been produced eleven billion years before. 
This discovery was published in the journal Nature and was reported in the international press.

The discovery has relevance for the studies on the theories of the expansion of the universe, and especially, on the calculation of the Hubble constant which measures the relationship between distance and speed of celestial bodies (galaxies).
In 2008 Impellizzeri was recruited by the NRAO to work on the cosmology project of MCP (Megamaser Cosmology Project). She was entrusted with the coordination of the research conducted with the Green Bank Telescope in Virginia, and of the observations made with the VLBI (Very Long Baseline Observatory). 
She worked intensively for the MCP project during the three years spent in Virginia but remained as a collaborator in the project over the ensuing ten years.

Meanwhile, the U.S.A., Europe and Japan were going to build the largest radio telescope in the world in Chile, in the Atacama desert at an altitude of five thousand meters. Impellizzeri was sent to work by NRAO as an astronomer for the realization of this ambitious project. From the beginning, she was charged with the integration of the VLBI observations within ALMA (under the title of friend of VLBI). In order to be able to make observations with other telescopes over the world, even distant 10,000 kilometers between them, as if it were only one with a diameter of 10,000 km. In nearly 10 years of observations at ALMA, they have made discoveries and verified many theories.

In 2017, they started the observations with the Event Horizon Telescope (EHT) hoping to realize the first image of a Black hole. By then, black holes had only been a theory, big masses with an enormous gravitational force devouring everything approaching them and from which nothing escaped, not even light. Nobody, however, could prove their existence, unless indirectly (see about Andrea Ghez the Nobel prize in 2020, Stefan Gillessen and others) until they published the first photo.

The telescopes contributing to this result were Alma, Apex, the 30 meters IRAM of Grenoble, the James Clerk Maxwell Telescope, the Alfonso Serrano telescope, the Submillimeter Array telescope, the Submillimeter Telescope, and the South Pole Telescope. They chose the black hole in the center of the galaxy Messier 87 at a distance of 56 million light years; this black hole has a mass of 6.5 billion solar masses.

Honors
 Earned the title of Woman of Stars and a publication on Nature (journal) for the discovery of the most ancient water in the universe;   
 11 August 2018: Assigned the Tablet Paul Harris Fellow (the greatest acknowledgment of Rotary Clubs) for the diffusion of Italian culture;
 18 April 2019: the Chilean government awarded the astronomer with a medal, as official recognition for the work done in the exploration of the Black hole.
 12 August 2019: A Tablet is given by the Mayor of Alcamo for her prestigious career in the field of scientific research.
 2020: Together with the other Astrophysicists who realized the photo of the Black hole, she was awarded with the prestigious Breakthrough Prize (2020).
 11 August 2021: Yearly Prize by the Kiwanis club of Alcamo, with the following motivation: To Violette Impellizzeri, astronomer with an international fame, for her dedication for the study of the mysteries of universe and for the safeguard of environment.
28 November 2022: KHMW Outreach Award for her project ALMA for Leiden.

See also
Atacama Large Millimeter Array
Breakthrough Prize
Leiden University

References

Sources

External links

21st-century Italian women scientists
21st-century Italian astronomers
Italian astrophysicists
Scientists from Sicily
People from Alcamo
1977 births
Living people